is a private university located in the city of Aomori, Japan, founded in 1968.  The university has three major areas of study: business administration, sociology, and software and information technology.

References

External links
  (Japanese)

Educational institutions established in 1968
Private universities and colleges in Japan
Universities and colleges in Aomori Prefecture
Aomori (city)